is Morning Musume's 69th single. It was released on December 16, 2020.

Information 
All lyrics and compositions were created by Tsunku.

The Limited Edition SP came with an event lottery serial number card.

In the video clip of Gyuu Sareta Dake na no ni, Mizuki Fukumura, Erina Ikuta and Ayumi Ishida dressed as rabbits.

Featured lineup 

 9th generation: Mizuki Fukumura, Erina Ikuta
 10th generation: Ayumi Ishida, Masaki Sato
 11th generation: Sakura Oda
 12th generation: Miki Nonaka, Maria Makino, Akane Haga
 13th generation: Kaede Kaga, Reina Yokoyama
 14th generation: Chisaki Morito
 15th th generation: Rio Kitagawa, Homare Okamura, Mei Yamazaki

Junjou Evidence Vocalists

Main Voc: Mizuki Fukumura, Masaki Sato, Sakura Oda,  Miki Nonaka

Minor Voc: Erina Ikuta, Ayumi Ishida, Maria Makino, Akane Haga, Kaede Kaga, Reina Yokoyama, Chisaki Morito, Rio Kitagawa, Homare Okamura, Mei Yamazaki

Gyuu Saretai Dake na no ni Vocalists

Main Voc: Mizuki Fukumura, Masaki Sato

Center Voc:Sakura Oda, Miki Nonaka, Akane Haga, Rio Kitagawa, Mei Yamazaki

Minor Voc: Erina Ikuta, Ayumi Ishida, Maria Makino, Kaede Kaga, Reina Yokoyama, Chisaki Morito, Homare Okamura

Track listing

CD 

 Junjou Evidence
 Gyuu Saretai Dake na no ni
 Junjou Evidence (Instrumental)
 Gyuu Saretai Dake na no ni (Instrumental)

Limited Edition A DVD 

 Junjou Evidence (Music Video)
 Junjou Evidence (Making Video)

Limited Edition B DVD 

 Gyuu Saretai Dake na no ni (Music Video)
 Gyuu Saretai Dake na no ni (Making Eizou)

Limited Edition SP DVD 

 Junjou Evidence (Dance Shot Ver.)
 Gyuu Saretai Dake na no ni (Dance Shot Ver.)
 Junjou Evidence (Close-up Ver.)
 Gyuu Saretai Dake na no ni (Close-up Ver.)

Charts Positions

Oricon
Daily and Weekly

Monthly

Billboard Japan Top Single Sales

References 

Morning Musume songs
2020 singles
Zetima Records singles
Songs written by Tsunku
Hello! Project
Dance-pop songs